Timmy Lenox is a fictional character from the NBC/DirecTV daytime drama Passions portrayed by Josh Ryan Evans. The actor died of a congenital heart defect the very day his character Timmy died on the show and donated his heart to Charity Standish.

Storylines

Timmy was originally a doll created by the town witch Tabitha Lenox as a sidekick in her various evil schemes against the people of Harmony. However, Timmy has a good heart and comes to love Charity Standish, a main target of Tabitha's evil, for her innocence and kindness. At times Timmy interferes with Tabitha's schemes to get rid of Charity. For example, when Tabitha plans to make Charity kill Miguel by giving him a poisoned petit four, Timmy swaps the petit four, resulting in Tabitha eating it and melting. Tabitha survives through the help of Timmy, Dr. Bombay, and Matilda. At another time Tabitha and Timmy are locked in a psych ward because Tabitha wants to be close to Charity. When Tabitha overhears them giving a drug to Charity that can make her open to suggestion, Tabitha uses the incident to tell Charity to kill Miguel. However, when Tabitha can't escape, Timmy is removed. Timmy foils Tabitha's plan by telling Charity not to kill Miguel. 

Tabitha discovers she owes taxes, but can't pay because she had lost her powers when she tried to kill Charity in a house fire. Timmy finds out about Tabitha's memoirs, steals them, and published them. During that time Tabitha and Timmy discovers that the evil witch and an enemy of Tabitha's, Hecuba, plans to destroy Charity and take Tabitha's place. They also discover that Kay had sold her soul to Hecuba to break Charity and Miguel. Later on, when Tabitha's memoirs are published, they flee town only to nearly end up getting killed by a hotel owner named Norma. They return to Harmony to find that Hecuba has Charity trapped in a closet to Hell. Later, Tabitha and Timmy are summoned to Hecuba's cave. While there, they learned that Kay and Miguel are trying to destroy Hecuba in order to save Charity. They open a box of light to try to destroy Hecuba, but fail due to Miguel closing the box before Hecuba is destroyed. Tabitha and Timmy survive the box and are set free. They then trick Hecuba and trap her in a bottle, leaving Kay's soul with Tabitha. They return home and throw the bottle in the basement. Tabitha and Timmy then find out that Kay and Miguel went back into Hell to try to rescue Charity and also realized that they were being dragged to the 10th level of Hell. Timmy learns from Tabitha that Charity could be saved through a Demon's Claw. The Little Angel Girl comes to Timmy, seeing that he has a good heart, and encourages him to use it. Timmy uses the Demon's Claw, resulting in the closet to Hell in Charity's closet to be destroyed and saving Charity. Timmy returns Kay's soul after hearing Charity pray. 

Timmy, who wants to be a real boy, has that wish finally granted by the Little Angel Girl in January 2002. Tabitha begins introducing him as her great-nephew, as he can now meet mortals without turning back into an inanimate doll. Timmy, now a real boy, knows that the real Charity is trapped in a block of ice and wants to find a way to save her. He learns from a book of spells that a Demon's Horn can destroy the evil Charity that Kay created and save the real Charity. Timmy leaves Harmony in search of the Demon's Horn. During that journey Timmy meets Julian Crane, who had fled Harmony due to everyone trying to kill him. Julian helps Timmy on his journey, at times saving him from Zombie Charity's assassins. When Timmy returns to Harmony, he uses the Demon's Horn to save Charity. The real Charity and Zombie Charity fight, and during the fight Zombie Charity attacks Timmy with her powers, leaving him gravely injured. Timmy later dies on August 5, 2002, unable to heal from the injuries inflicted by Zombie Charity. 

After his death, Tabitha gets her powers back, having lost them for failing to destroy Charity. She wants to revive Timmy but learns that she unknowingly signed a form that gave Timmy's heart to Charity. She tries to stop the heart transplant, but Timmy appears and convinces her not to. 

Timmy appears to Tabitha in October 2003 as a surprise to meet Tabitha's new daughter, Endora. The spirit of Timmy makes an appearance in late 2007, advising Tabitha to use good, not evil, to rescue her daughter Endora and Miguel Lopez-Fitzgerald from the dark side.

Reception 
2000 YoungStar Award for Best Young Actor/Performance in a Daytime TV Series
2000 Soap Opera Digest Award for Favorite Scene Stealer
2001 Soap Opera Digest Award for Outstanding Male Scene Stealer

See also
 Passions eerie deaths

References

External links
Character Study: PASSIONS's Most Entertaining Characters at Soapoperadigest.com
Who's who in Harmony: Timmy at Soapcentral.com

Lenox, Timmy
Lenox, Timmy
Fictional ghosts
Lenox, Timmy
Lenox, Timmy